China Scenic Avenue is an elite series of women's professional one-day road bicycle race held in China and each are currently rated by the UCI as a 1.2 race.

Past winners

China Scenic Avenue I

China Scenic Avenue II

References 

Cycle races in China
Women's road bicycle races